Agé (or Age) is a god in the mythology of the Fon people of Africa. He is the son of Mawu-Lisa. Agé is the patron god of hunters, the wilderness, and the animals within it. He is the fourth-born son of Mawu-Lisa. When she divided up the realms of the universe among her children, she gave Agé command of the game animals and birds and put him in charge of uninhabited land.

References

Dahomean gods
Hunting gods
Voodoo gods